Pawankhind is a 2022 Indian Marathi-language historical action drama film directed by Digpal Lanjekar and produced under the banner of Almonds Creations in association with AA Films. The film based on the life of Maratha warrior, Baji Prabhu Deshpande, stars Chinmay Mandlekar, Mrinal Kulkarni, Ajay Purkar, Sameer Dharmadhikari, along with Ankit Mohan, Prajakta Mali and Kshitee Jog in supporting roles.

It is the third entry in an eight-film series on the Maratha Empire. After Farzand and Fatteshikast, Digpal Lanjekar announced this third film on unsung Maratha heroes. It was followed by Sher Shivraj. The film was a huge commercial success with  film become the fifth highest-grossing Marathi film of all time and second highest-grossing Marathi film of 2022.

Synopsis
The film depicts the historical rearguard last stand that took place on 13 July 1660 at a mountain pass in the vicinity of fort Vishalgad, near the city of Kolhapur, Maharashtra, India between the Maratha Warrior Baji Prabhu Deshpande and Siddi Masud of Adilshah Sultanate, known as Battle of Pavan Khind.

Plot
The film begins in 1674 with the Shivaji Maharaj (Chinmay Mandlekar) telling story of Battle of Pavan Khind to Sambhaji Maharaj (Stavan Shinde). The plot frequently switches flashback to 1660.

Badi Begum (Kshitee Jog) asked everyone ‘’Who has dare to kill Shivaji’’? then Siddi Johar (Sameer Dharmadhikari) came into the kingdom & said "I have dare to kill Shivaji". Badi Begum gives him a chance to prove himself on one condition. If he kills Shivaji Maharaj she will give him a post in Bijapur Sultanate & If he is unsuccessful in killing Shivaji Maharaj , she will kill him.

At that time Shivaji Maharaj was encamped at Panhala fort with his forces. Siddi Johar's army besieged the fort of Panhala and cut off the supply of routes to the fort. During the bombardment of Panhala, Siddi Johar purchased grenades from the English at Rajapur and hired some English personalities in their force.

Shivaji Maharaj gave order to Bahirji Naik (Harish Dudhade) to search a secret road of Vishalgad in order to escape. Bahirji found the road and Shivaji Maharaj escaped from Panhala by cover of night but here they create a Shivaji Maharaj's look alike Shiva Kashid (Ajinkya Nanaware), a barber by profession sending him for the meeting with Siddi Johar. Shiva Kashid went to Siddi Johar but when Fazal Khan recognized him, Siddi killed Shiva Kashid.

Here Adilshah's army was in pursuit with an army of 10,000. Then, Shivaji Maharaj decided to split his forces. Baji Prabhu Deshpande (Ajay Purkar) agreed to face Adilshah's troops with 300 soldiers. Shivaji Maharaj told him that he would hear cannons being fired 5 times, signaling Shivaji Maharaj's safety.

Baji Prabhu occupied Ghodkhind, blocking the path of Adilshah troops. His brother, Fulaji, Rayaji Bandal, Shambusingh Jadhav, Aginya were present with him. Fulaji, Aginya, Rayaji and Shambusingh were killed after fierce fight. Baji Prabhu were wounded but carried on fighting at Ghodkhind. Five hours after starting the battle, the cannons were fired announcing that Shivaji Maharaj safely returned to Vishalgad.

The plot frequently switches to 1674. Shivaji Maharaj renamed Ghodkhind to Pawankind in honour of the sacrifices of the 300 Maratha troops.

Cast 
Chinmay Mandlekar as Chhatrapati Shivaji Maharaj
Mrinal Kulkarni as Rajmata Jijabai
Ajay Purkar as Baji Prabhu Deshpande
Ruchi Savarn as Matoshri  Soyarabai 
Prajakta Mali as Shrimant Bhavanibai Bandal
Surabhi Bhave as Matoshri Sonai Deshpande 
Kshitee Jog as Badi Begum.
Madhavi Nimkar as Matoshri Gautamai Deshpande
Sameer Dharmadhikari as Siddi Johar
Ujjwala Jog as Bajiprabhu's mother Bayobai Deshpande
Astad Kale as Siddi Masud
Rishi  Saxena as Rustam Zaman
Sushrut Mankani as Fazar Khan
Ankit Mohan as Rayajirao Bandal
Dipti Ketkar as Dipaiaau Bandal
Harish Dudhade as Bahirji Naik
Akshay Waghmare as Koyaji Bandal
Ajinkya Nanaware as Narvir Shiva Kashid
Bipin Surve as Shambu Singh Jadhavrao
Kunal Dhumal as Sarjerao Jedhe
Vaibhav Mangle as Gangadharpant
Sunil Jadhav as Fulajiprabhu Deshpande
Sachin Bhilare as Aaginya
Vikram Gaikwad as Netaji Palkar
Shivraj Waichal as Harpya
Rajan Bhise as Kanhoji Jedhe
Santosh Juvekar as Guest appearance in song "Raja Ala Raja Ala"

Production

Development 
In December 2019 after Farzand and Fatteshikast, Digpal Lanjekar announced a new film 'Jung Jauhar', his third film on unsung Maratha heroes.

Filming 
On 11 February 2020, principal photography took place in Raigad Fort, Maharashtra. Filming was completed on 19 March 2020. In February 2021 makers renamed Jungjauhar to Pawankhind.

Soundtrack

Soundtrack of the film is composed by Devdutta Manisha Baji and lyrics written by Digpal Lanjekar. Video of track "Yugat Mandli" sung by Haridas Shinde, Avadhoot Gandhi was released in December 2021.

Release

Theatrical 
Pawankhind was originally scheduled to release on 10 June 2021, but was postponed due to the COVID-19 pandemic.  The second release date 31 December 2021, but the release was again delayed due to the increasing number of COVID-19 cases, fuelled by the SARS-CoV-2 Omicron variant.  The film was released on 18 February 2022.

Home media 

The film was released digitally streamed on Amazon Prime Video from 20 March 2022. Star India Network acquired by the satellite rights of this film

Reception

Box office
Pawankhind collected  crore in the opening week of its release.

 the film has grossed  Crore. The film ended its theatrical collecting a worldwide gross of  crores with Indian nett collections of 35.70 crores at the Box Office.

Critical response
Pawankhind received critical acclaim. Mihir Bhanage from The Times of India gave 3.5 stars (out of 5), saying that "Pawankhind excels in storytelling, the technical aspects, though good, could have been better. The background score overpowers dialogues in some important scenes, and the action choreography in some scenes fails to make the cut. However, all said and done, the entire team has done its best to make this a big screen experience. Maybe with a bigger budget, these things can be ironed out in the following films of Lanjekar's series" Shriram Iyengar from Cinestaan.com wrote that "Of course, the drama is heightened. It is important to remember that the film feels coloured by a majoritarian bias. Yet, that was always the style of folk dramatists. They could change the tone to suit the audience. Cinema can claim to be no different. There are moments in the final action sequence when the VFX glitches are visible, but they do not hinder the story in any way" Kalpesh Kubal from Maharashtra Times Wrote that "The technical side seems to have faltered somewhat; But that can be ignored. Throughout the story of the film, the director has tried to underline various knights" 
Lokmat Wrote "hard work of the director and the actors can be seen on the screen. To experience an unprecedented history, you must visit this movie theater and watch it at least once"

References

External links 
 

2022 drama films
2022 films
Indian historical drama films
2020s Marathi-language films
Films set in the Maratha Empire
Films postponed due to the COVID-19 pandemic